Konstantinos Paspatis (5 June 1878 (registered at birth in England as Constantine George Paspatis) – 1 July 1903) was a Greek tennis player. He competed at the 1896 Summer Olympics in Athens. He was born in Liverpool, England and died in Athens.

Paspatis won a bronze medal in the singles tournament.  In the first round, he defeated George S. Robertson of Great Britain and Ireland.  His second round opponent was fellow Greek Aristidis Akratopoulos, whom Paspatis defeated as well.  He met eventual gold medallist John Pius Boland in the semifinals, however, and was defeated.  Since there was no playoff for third place, Paspatis and Momcsilló Tapavicza of Hungary are considered to share third. In the doubles tournament, Paspatis and partner Evangelos Rallis (also of Greece) were defeated in the first round by Dionysios Kasdaglis and Demetrios Petrokokkinos, also Greeks (the former from Egypt).  This put the pair in two-way tie for fourth place of the five pairs.

References

External links

1878 births
1903 deaths
19th-century English people
19th-century Greek people
19th-century male tennis players
British people of Greek descent
English people of Greek descent
Greek male tennis players
Olympic bronze medalists for Greece
Olympic tennis players of Greece
Sportspeople from Liverpool
Tennis players at the 1896 Summer Olympics
Olympic medalists in tennis
Medalists at the 1896 Summer Olympics
Greek expatriates in the United Kingdom